Catoxantha opulenta is a species of jewel beetles belonging to the family Buprestidae, subfamily Chrysochroinae.

Subspecies
Catoxantha opulenta borneensis Kurosawa, 1993 
Catoxantha opulenta opulenta (Gory, 1832)

Description

This beautiful and quite common jewel beetle has metallic dark bluish-green elytra with thick and prominent black costae and two yellow transverse bands. Abdominal sternum is yellow. It bores the wood of Chukrasia velutina and Lagerstroemia speciosa. The life-cycle is annual. Adults emerge in June.

Distribution
This beetle is present in Thailand, Malaysia, western Indonesia and Philippines.

References
 Biolib
  Forest Insects of India
 Buprestidae of Indo-Malaysia, Indochina and Philippines
 Siam Insects

Buprestidae
Beetles described in 1832